The South African Railways Class  of 1976 is a diesel-electric locomotive.

Between March 1976 and May 1980, the South African Railways placed one hundred Class  General Electric type U15C diesel-electric locomotives in branch line service.

Manufacturer
The Class  type GE U15C diesel-electric locomotive was designed by General Electric (GE) and built for the South African Railways (SAR) by the South African General Electric-Dorman Long Locomotive Group (SA , later Dorbyl). The first batch of fifty locomotives was delivered between March and December 1976, numbered in the range from 35-401 to 35-450.

Distinguishing features

The locomotive has interlinked bogies, hence the "Co+Co" wheel arrangement classification. The linkage is usually hidden from view by the saddle-shaped fuel tank.

With the two GE U15C Class 35 models, the Class  can be distinguished from the Class  by the length of the humps on their long hoods, the Class  having a hump that is more than twice as long as that of the Class . An externally visible modification which was done during major overhauls is the addition of a saddle hood astride the long hump of the Class . By 2013 this modification had been done on a large number of long-humped Class  units, but no similar modification was done on any short-humped Class .

Service

South African Railways

The Class 35 family is South Africa's standard branch line diesel-electric locomotive. The GE Class  was designed to operate on light rail and they work on most branch lines in the central, western, southern and southeastern parts of the country.

In the Western Cape, they work out of Bellville Depot in Cape Town on the branch lines to Bitterfontein, Saldanha and Caledon, and out of Worcester to George. Since the Ceres branch was reopened during 2012 in terms of an agreement between the Ceres Rail Company and Transnet, they also work fruit container trains in that line during the fruit season.

NLPI Ltd.
NLPI Limited, abbreviated from New Limpopo Projects Investments, is a Mauritius-registered company which specialises in private sector investments, using the build-operate-transfer (BOT) concept. It had three connected railway operations in Zimbabwe and Zambia that formed a rail link between South Africa and the Democratic Republic of Congo.
 The Beitbridge Bulawayo Railway (BBR) was commissioned on 1 September 1999 and operates the Beit Bridge to Bulawayo line in Zimbabwe.
 Since February 2004 NLPI Logistics (NLL or LOG) has been operating between Bulawayo and Victoria Falls on the Zimbabwe-Zambia border.
 Since February 2003, the Railway Systems of Zambia (RSZ) operated on the former Zambia Railways (ZR) line from Victoria Falls to Sakania in the Congo.

These locomotives were sometimes marked as either BBR or LOG or both, but their status, whether leased or loaned, was unclear since they were still on the TFR roster and still often worked in South Africa as well. The locomotives did not appear to be restricted to work in any one of the three operations sections and have been observed being transferred between Zimbabwe and Zambia across the bridge at Victoria Falls as required. Class  locomotives which serve with NLPI include the locomotives annotated "NLPI" in the "leased or loaned" column in the table.

Zambia Railways, the state-owned holding company, resumed control of the Zambian national rail network on 11 September 2012. This followed the Zambian government’s decision to revoke the operating concession which had been awarded to RSZ after Finance Minister Alexander Chikwanda claimed that RSZ had "blatantly disregarded the provisions of the agreement" and had been "acting in a manner prejudicial to the interests of Zambians”.

Tanzania Railways
Ten Class  locomotives were leased to Tanzania Railways, where they were regauged to Metre gauge. Locomotives which served there include the ones annotated "Tanzania" in the "leased or loaned" column in the table.

Zaire
Class  locomotives were also leased to Société Nationale des Chemins de Fer Zaïrois (SNCZ) in Zaire and were occasionally used by Zambia Railways on their journey north through Zambia. This was done with the agreement of SNCZ, who stipulated that they could only haul transit traffic for Zaire. Class  locomotives which were noted in such service through Zambia were, amongst others, two unidentified locomotives at Kabwe in August 1981, no. 35-464 at Choma in May 1985, no. 35-451 at Lusaka in February 1986, and another unidentified locomotive at Lusaka in May 1990, all under power on northbound goods.

Works numbers
The Class  builder's works numbers and known international deployment are listed in the table.

Liveries
The Class 35-000 were all delivered in the SAR Gulf Red livery with signal red buffer beams, yellow side stripes on the long hood sides and a yellow V on each end. In the 1990s many of the Class 35-400 units began to be repainted in the Spoornet orange livery with a yellow and blue chevron pattern on the buffer beams. In the late 1990s many were repainted once again, this time in the Spoornet blue livery with outline numbers on the long hood sides. After 2008 in the Transnet Freight Rail (TFR) era many were repainted in the TFR red, green and yellow livery.

Illustration
The last picture below shows the roof of a Class  U15C locomotive. It was involved in a major derailment near Moorreesburg on 7 June 2007 after the track roadbed was washed away during heavy rain and flooding.

References

External video link

3440
C-C locomotives
Co′Co′ locomotives
Co+Co locomotives
General Electric locomotives
Dorbyl locomotives
Cape gauge railway locomotives
Railway locomotives introduced in 1976
1976 in South Africa